Jennifer Bolande is an American postconceptual artist whose work employs various media—primarily photography, sculpture, film and site-specific installations in which she explores affinities between particular sets of objects and images and the mercurial meanings they manufacture. 

Bolande earned a Bachelor of Fine Arts from Nova Scotia College of Art & Design in 1979. She is a Professor in New Genres in the Department of Art at UCLA. She lives and works in Los Angeles and Joshua Tree, California. 

Bolande emerged as an artist in the late 1970s, working initially in dance, choreography and drawing. In the early 1980s, she advanced the ideas and strategies proposed by the Pictures Generation movement and began working with found images, re-photography, appropriation, film and installation; taking her place among those artists who have helped to redefine art photography. Bolande takes an intuitive post-conceptual approach to creating conceptual photo-based works in the construction of a coherent visual language. This was early on demonstrated in 1984 with her participation in the Hallwalls Contemporary Arts Center CEPA Gallery group exhibition MOTIVES, curated by Claudia Gould.

A retrospective exhibition of her work was organized in 2010 by the University of Wisconsin–Milwaukee and traveled to the Institute of Contemporary Art, Philadelphia, and the Luckman Gallery at California State University, Los Angeles. A monograph on her work was published by JRP-Ringier and distributed by Distributed Art Publishers in conjunction with the retrospective show. Her award-winning site-specific project Visible Distance/Second Sight was featured in the inaugural Desert Exhibition of Art, in 2017. 

In the early 2000s, she exhibited three times with the New York gallery Alexander and Bonin, who is associated with the Brooke Alexander Gallery. A 2018 exhibition at Pio Pico Gallery, Los Angeles, titled The Composition of Decomposition, included a body of works taking the newspaper as a point of departure for photographs, film and sculptural works. She is represented by the gallery Magenta Plains in New York City who also exhibited in 2020 thereThe Composition of Decomposition.

Solo exhibitions 

 The Composition of Decomposition, New York (2020)
 The Composition of Decomposition, Pio Pico, Los Angeles (2018)
 Measured Against What, Green Gallery, Chicago (2014)
 Landmarks, a Survey Exhibition, Luckman Gallery, California State University, Los Angeles (2012)
 Landmarks, a Survey Exhibition, Institute of Contemporary Art, Philadelphia, PA
 Landmarks, a Survey Exhibition, Institute of Visual Arts, INOVA, Wisconsin, MI (2010)
 Mathematics and Myths of Yesterday and Today, Thomas Solomon & Cottage Home, Los Angeles
 Plywood Curtains, West of Rome Public Art, citywide installation, Los Angeles
 Smoke Screens, Alexander and Bonin, New York (2008)
 Earthquake, Alexander and Bonin, New York (2004)
Globe Sightings, Fotohof, Salzburg, Austria (2003)
 Globe Sightings, Alexander and Bonin, New York (2001)
 The City at Night, Alexander and Bonin, New York (1999)
 MoMA P.S.1, Long Island City, New York
 Road Movie, John Gibson Gallery, New York (1995)
 Kunstraum München, Munich, Germany
 Kunsthalle Palazzo, Liestal, Switzerland
 Richard Telles Fine Art, Los Angeles (1994)
 Metro Pictures, New York (1992)
 Urbi et Orbi, Paris France (1990)
 Galleri Nordanstad-Skarstedt, Stockholm, Sweden
 Margo Leavin Gallery, Los Angeles (1989)
 Metro Pictures, New York (1988)
 Galerie Sophia Ungers, Cologne, Germany (1987)
 Nature Morte, New York (1986)
 Artists Space, New York (1983)
 The Kitchen, New York (1982)

Group exhibitions

 Celebration of Our Enemies, Hammer Museum, Los Angeles, CA;
 Readymades Are For Everyone, Swiss Institute, New York, NY;
 Brand New: Art and Commodity in the 1980s, Hirschorn Museum, Washington, DC;
 Make Believe, Magenta Plains, New York, NY;
 Arcadias, Magenta Plains, New York, NY;
 Skyscraper, Museum of Contemporary Art, Chicago;
 The Pathos of Things, Carriage Trade, New York; 
 Artists and Architecture; Variable Dimensions, du Pavillon de l’Arsenale, Paris
 Private Investigations, Presentation House Gallery, Vancouver, BC; 
 Mixed Use Manhattan, Museo Nacional Centro de Arte Reina Sofia, Madrid; 
 This Will Have Been, Art Love and Politics in the 1980s, Museum of Contemporary Art, Chicago; Walker Art Center, Minneapolis, and ICA, Boston, MA
 , Presentation House Gallery, Vancouver, BC
 Deep Storage, Haus der Kunst, Munich; Kunstmuseum, Düsseldorf; PSI, New York; Henry Art Gallery, Seattle, WA
 The Readymade Boomerang, Eighth Biennale of Sydney, Australia; 
 Status of Sculpture, Institute of Contemporary Arts, London.

Fellowships
Bolande is the recipient of fellowships from the John Simon Guggenheim Memorial Foundation, the New York Foundation for the Arts, the Lower Manhattan Cultural Council, the Tesuque Foundation, the Canadian Council on the Arts, the Elizabeth Firestone Graham Foundation, and the Andy Warhol Foundation for the Visual Arts.

Artist books 
Bolande has published several artist books including The Times, 2016, Excavation Volumes 1-35, 2016, Short Story, 2015, and Space Photography, 2010, published by ZG Press.

Selected public collections 
Bolande has work in several collections of public museums and institutions including

 MOCA, Los Angeles
MAMCO, Geneva
 Centre Pompidou, Paris
 Moderna Museet, Stockholm
 San Francisco Museum of Modern Art
Museum of Fine Arts, Boston
 Hammer Museum, Los Angeles
Miami Art Museum
 LACMA, Los Angeles
The Israel Museum, Jerusalem
 Palm Springs Art Museum, Palm Springs

Notes

External links
 Jennifer Bolande website
Jennifer Bolande Vimeo
Scoping Things on the Cutting Edge: A conversation between Jennifer Bolande and Marie de Brugerolle, Mousse Magazine
Jennifer Bolande “It draws attention to the transition between here and there” Interview with Rob Anderson, WePresent, 2017
 Jennifer Bolande, "Remembering Jack Goldstein," Afterall 7 (Spring/Summer 2003).

1957 births
Living people
Artists from Cleveland
UCLA School of the Arts and Architecture faculty
NSCAD University alumni